The 2010 Indian Federation Cup Final was the 32nd final of the Indian Federation Cup, the top knock-out competition in India, and was contested between arch-rivals East Bengal and Mohun Bagan on 2 October 2010.

East Bengal won the final 1–0, to successfully retain and claim their seventh Federation Cup title. Reisangmei Vashum scored the solitary goal for the Red and Gold brigade in the 53rd minute from Robin Singh's lay-off pass.

Route to the final

East Bengal

East Bengal entered the 2010 Indian Federation Cup automatically as they were already in the I-League. They were placed in Group A along with Air India, HAL, and Pune FC and their matches were played in Cuttack. The tournament got off to a great start for East Bengal as they defeated Air India in their opening match by 3–1 with Tolgay Ozbey scoring a brace and Robin Singh scoring the third. Bijith Setty scored a consolation goal in the 89th minute for Air India. In the second match, East Bengal came from behind to defeat HAL by 2–1 with Penn Orji and Tolgay Ozbey finding the back of the net in the 13th and 33rd minute respectively after Hamza put HAL ahead in the 9th minute. In the last game of the group stages, East Bengal pipped Pune FC by 1–0 with Penn Orji finding the back of the net once again in the 67th minute as the Red and Gold brigade confirmed the top spot in the group with 3 wins and progressed to the Semi-finals where they would face Churchill Brothers. Tolgay Ozbey's 11th-minute strike was enough for Trevor Morgan's men to reach the final.

Mohun Bagan

Mohun Bagan entered the 2010 Indian Federation Cup automatically as they were already in the I-League. They were placed in Group D along with Mumbai, Salgaocar and Shillong Lajong and their matches were played in Cuttack.The tournament got off to a mix start as well for Bagan as they won against Shillong Lajong 1–0 in their first match with Muritala Ali scoring the winner for Bagan and then drew goalless with Mumbai FC in their second match. In the last game of the group they required a win against Salgaocar to qualify and Bagan thrashed the Goan club by 6–1 with José Ramirez Barreto and Muritala Ali scoring hattricks each. In the semi-finals Mohun Bagan took on Dempo and the game ended 1–1 after 120 minutes. Ranti Martins put Dempo ahead in the 2nd minute while Chidi Edeh scored the equaliser in the 66th minute for Bagan. In the penalty shootout, Sangram Mukherjee saved Ogba Kalu Nnanna's shot as they won 5–3 to reach the finals.

Match

Details

References

1
East Bengal Club matches
Mohun Bagan AC matches
Indian Federation Cup Finals